Krtova  (Cyrillic: Кртова) is a village in the municipalities of Petrovo (Republika Srpska) and Lukavac, Bosnia and Herzegovina.

Demographics 
According to the 2013 census, its population was 409, with 138 of them living in the Petrovo part and 271 in the Lukavac part.

References

Populated places in Lukavac
Populated places in Petrovo, Bosnia and Herzegovina